Flying Saucer Blues is the seventh album by the American singer-songwriter Peter Case, released in 2000.

Critical reception

Music critic Denise Sullivan of Allmusic praised the album, writing "Never one to rely on formula, Case mixes his brand of incisive folk-rock with some simpatico musical styles…" Writing for No Depression, Jim Musser was equivocal about the album, writing "Maybe the singer-songwriter’s willful escape from pop bought its own particular travails. More likely, Peter Case is just very capable instead of great. This is (again) a collection of well-crafted songs; all of the pieces (again) seem to be here. The playing and songs are top-drawer; the voice is simply…nice."

Track listing
All songs written by Peter Case unless otherwise noted.
"Paradise etc" – 3:51
"Cool Drink O' Water" – 5:02
"Blue Distance" – 4:50
"Walking Home Late" – 3:55
"Coulda Shoulda Woulda" (Case, Kevin Bowe, Duane Jarvis) – 2:43
"Something Happens" – 2:47
"Two Heroes" (Case, LeRoy Marinell) – 6:13
"Lost in Your Eyes" – 3:55
"Black Dirt & Clay" – 4:25
"Cold Trail Blues" – 4:38
"This Could Be the One" – 3:44

Personnel
Peter Case – vocals, guitar, harmonica
Sandy Chila – drums
Don Heffington – percussion
David Jackson – upright bass
Greg Leisz – dobro, lap steel guitar, mandolin, pedal steel guitar
Andrew Williams – banjo, glockenspiel, guitar, harmonium, harmony vocals, background vocals
Gabe Witcher – fiddle
Darrell Leonard – horn
Joe Sublett – horn
David Perales – violin

Production
Andrew Williams – producer, engineer, mixing
Michael Meltzer – engineer
Jim Wirt – mixing
Greg Allen – package design, photography
Doug Erb – illustrations

References

2000 albums
Peter Case albums
Vanguard Records albums